Dayanidhi Choudhury, also known as D.N. Choudhury()(1 January 1916 – 22 September 2000)  was the first Odia IFS (Indian Forest Service) and he is the former Chief Conservator of Forest, Govt. of Odisha and during his period lot of developments happened with respect to forest and wildlife conservation, that includes Nandankanan Zoological Park at Bhubaneswar, Similipal Elephant/Tiger reserve in 1956, which is now a prominent National Park in India.

See also

 Nandankanan Zoological Park
 Simlipal National Park

References
 Official website of: "Forest Research Institute (India), Dehradun"
 Rao, V. S. 1961. 100 years of Indian Forestry. Souvenir. Forest Research Institute. Dehradun. scanned version Pg-153 (xi) Orissa
 The Indian Forester, Volume 97, Pg-63,119

External links
 Official website of: "Nandankanan Zoological Park"
 "List of Officers trained (1938-1940) at Indian Forest College, Dehradun"

1916 births
2000 deaths
Indian conservationists
Indian foresters
People from Odisha
People from Khordha district
Ravenshaw University alumni
Indian civil servants